Simon Dennis may refer to:
 Simon Dennis (cricketer) (born 1960), English cricketer
 Simon Dennis (footballer) (born 1973), Australian rules footballer
 Simon Dennis (rower) (born 1976), British rower